Djiredji is an arrondissement of Sédhiou in Sédhiou Region in Senegal.

References 

Arrondissements of Senegal